Leo Vendrame is a Japanese professional basketball player.

Playing career
He currently plays for the Sun Rockers Shibuya club of the B.League in Japan.

He represented Japan's national basketball team at the 2018 Asian Games in Jakarta–Palembang, Indonesia.

Career statistics

|-
| align="left" |  2015-16
| align="left" | Hitachi
| 17|| || 5.9|| .333|| .250|| 1.00|| 1.1|| 0.5|| 0.7|| 0.1|| 0.8|| 1.5 
|-
| align="left" |  2016-17
| align="left" | Shibuya
|  49 || 27 ||  22.3 ||  .404 || 33.0 ||  71.6 || 2.4 ||  2.7 ||  1.7 || 0.2 ||  1.8 || 8.4
|-
|-
| align="left" | 2017-18
| align="left" |Shibuya
|  59 || 27 ||  25.3 ||  .407 || 33.3 ||  77.1 || 2.4 ||  2.4 ||  1.4 || 0.0 ||  1.7 || 11.2
|-
| align="left" |  2018-19
| align="left" | Shibuya
|  60 || 60 ||  29.3 ||  .427 || 38.1 ||  68.6 || 2.4 ||  4.4 ||  0.9 || 0.1 ||  2.4 || 11.1
|}

References

External links
 

1993 births
Living people
Tokai University alumni
Japanese men's basketball players
Japanese people of Brazilian descent
Point guards
People from Chikushino, Fukuoka
Sportspeople from Fukuoka Prefecture
Sun Rockers Shibuya players
Basketball players at the 2018 Asian Games
Asian Games competitors for Japan
Basketball players at the 2020 Summer Olympics
Olympic basketball players of Japan